Ragtime to Rock 'n' Roll is a BBC Radio 2 documentary chronicling the trends in popular music in the US and UK from 1900s to 1960s. Narrated by Kenneth More, the 51-volume 26-part documentary was originally broadcast in 1974.

Episode List

Part 01 Dawn of a New Age 1900-1902
Part 02 Let the Good Times Roll 1902-1907
Part 03 Before the Lights Went Out 1908-1914
Part 04 The War to End War 1914-1917
Part 05 A Land Fit For Heroes 1918-1922
Part 06 The Start of the Jazz Age 1923-1927
Part 07 If I Had a Talking Picture 1927-1928
Part 08 Learn To Croon 1928-1929
Part 09 Ten Cents a Dance
Part 10 Who's Afraid of the Big Bad Wolf? 1932-1933
Part 11 Let's Face the Music 1934-1935
Part 12 Thanks for the Memory 1936-1937
Part 13 Over the Rainbow 1938-1939
Part 14 The Stuff to Give the Troops 1939-1944
Part 15 Business As Usual 1940-1942
Part 16 Over There 1942-1945
Part 17 My Guy's Come Home
Part 18 There'll Be Some Changes Made
Part 19 Revolutions in Sound 1948-early 1950s
Part 20 Music, Music, Music 1949-1952
Part 21 There's Gold in Them Thar Hills - Early 1950s
Part 22 Music to Make LPs By - Early 1950s
Part 23 Bands of Hope and Glory - Mid 1950s
Part 24 Trad and Other Fads
Part 25 The Rocks Sets In - Late 1950s
Part 26 Melody Lingers On - 1960s

References
 https://web.archive.org/web/20110708083050/http://www.bookzap.com/From_Ragtime_To_Rock_n_Roll_p/rag_torock.htm
 http://www.r2ok.co.uk/R2_timeline.htm

BBC Radio 2 programmes